Chakravarthy is a 1977 Indian Tamil-language film directed by Krishnan–Panju.

It was later remade in Telugu as Mugguru Mithrulu (1985), in Hindi as Dosti Dushmani (1986) and in Kannada as Brahma Vishnu Maheshwara (1988).

Plot 
Chakravarthy, a rich boy; Ranjit, a criminal's son brought up by Chakravarthy's family; and Prakash are close friends. Chakravarthy, who becomes a renowned surgeon, finds his short temper the main cause of the rift between him and Ranjit, who had become a police officer. Chakravarthy, by saving Ranjit's wife from molestation and rescuing Ranjit's own sister from the slums, eventually clears his friend's misunderstandings about him.

Cast 
Adapted from Indian Films:
 Jaishankar
 Srikanth
 Thengai Srinivasan
 S. A. Ashokan
 Senthamarai
 V. S. Raghavan
 Sharada
 Sripriya
 Y. Vijaya
 Manorama

Production 
Chakravarthy was directed by the duo Krishnan–Panju, and produced by P. V. T. Productions. The story and dialogues were written by Mahendran. The final length of the film measured .

Soundtrack 
The soundtrack of the film was composed by V. Kumar, and the lyrics were written by Kannadasan.

References

External links 
 

Films directed by Krishnan–Panju
Films scored by V. Kumar
Indian action drama films
Films with screenplays by Mahendran (filmmaker)
1970s Tamil-language films
1970s action drama films